Events in the year 1838 in Belgium.

Incumbents
Monarch: Leopold I
Prime Minister: Barthélémy de Theux de Meylandt

Events
7 April – Tariffs raised on woollen cloth, porcelain, glass, crystal and chemical products.
15 May – Court of assizes to have jury verdicts.
28 May – Provincial elections
1 June – Parliament approves government loan of 2 million Belgian francs for building highways and railways.
 June – Ghent linen factories begin mechanising.
1 August – Westmalle Brewery begins operations
24 September – Monument to the fallen of the Belgian Revolution inaugurated on Place des Martyrs, Brussels.
3 September – Insurance scheme established for railway workers.
17 December – Run on the Banque de Belgique.
23 December – Declarations on postal reciprocity between Belgium and the Office of the Prince of Tour and Taxis signed in Frankfurt am Main.

Publications
Periodicals
Almanach royal et du commerce de Belgique (Brussels, Balleroy)
Annuaire du clergé catholique du royaume de Belgique (Brussels, L. Schapen)
 Journal historique et littéraire, vol. 5 (Liège, P. Kersten).
Messager des sciences et des arts de la Belgique, vol. 6 (Ghent, Léonard Hebbelynck)
 Revue de Bruxelles, 2.

Official publications
Documents statistiques sur le Royaume de Belgique: recueillis et publiés par le Ministre de l'Intérieur (Brussels, Ch.-J. de Mat)

Guidebooks and directories
 Alexandre Ferrier de Tourettes, Guide pittoresque et artistique du voyageur en Belgique (Brussels, Société Belge de Librairie)

Fiction
Hendrik Conscience, De Leeuw van Vlaenderen (Antwerp, L.J. de Cort).

Art and architecture

Sculptures
 Guillaume Geefs, Pro Patria, Place des Martyrs, Brussels

Births
3 January – Joseph Dupont, violinist (died 1899) 
18 March – Jan Stobbaerts, painter (died 1914)
14 April – Charles Moeller, historian (died 1922)
16 April – Ernest Solvay, industrial chemist (died 1922)
23 April – Alfred Verwee, painter (died 1895)
9 July – Henriette Mayer van den Bergh, art collector (died 1920)
7 September – Louis Delacenserie, architect (died 1909)
6 October – Henry Gabriels, bishop (died 1921)
15 October – August Vandekerkhove, writer and painter (died 1923)
30 October – Lodewijk de Koninck, writer (died 1924)

Deaths
 9 February – Françoise Blin de Bourdon (born 1756), religious leader
 3 August – Nicolas-Jean Rouppe (born 1769), mayor of Brussels
 7 August – Jean-François van de Velde (born 1779), bishop of Ghent

References

 
1830s in Belgium